Zhores Ivanovich Alferov (15 March 19301 March 2019) was a Soviet and Russian physicist and academic who contributed significantly to the creation of modern heterostructure physics and electronics. He shared the 2000 Nobel Prize in Physics for the development of the semiconductor heterojunction for optoelectronics. He also became a politician in his later life, serving in the lower house of the Russian parliament, the State Duma, as a member of the Communist Party from 1995.

Early life and education
Alferov was born in Vitebsk, Byelorussian SSR, Soviet Union, to a Belarusian father, Ivan Karpovich Alferov, a factory manager, and a Jewish mother, Anna Vladimirovna Rosenblum. He was named after French socialist Jean Jaurès while his older brother was named Marx after Karl Marx. Alferov graduated from secondary school in Minsk in 1947 and started Belarusian Polytechnic Academy. In 1952, he received his B.S. from the V. I. Ulyanov (Lenin) Electrotechnical Institute (LETI) in Leningrad. Starting in 1953, Alferov worked in the Ioffe Physico-Technical Institute of the Academy of Sciences of the Soviet Union. From the institute, he earned several scientific degrees: a Candidate of Sciences in Technology in 1961 and a Doctor of Sciences in Physics and Mathematics in 1970.

Alferov then served as the director of the Ioffe Institute from 1987 to 2003. He was elected a corresponding member of the Academy of Sciences of the Soviet Union in 1972, and a full member in 1979. From 1989, he was Vice-President of the USSR Academy of Sciences and President of its Saint Petersburg Scientific Center.

Research
Starting at Ioffe Institute in 1953, Alferov worked with a group led by Vladimir Tuchkevich, who became director of the Ioffe Institute in 1967, on planar semiconductor amplifiers for use in radio receivers. These planar semiconductor amplifiers would be referred to as transistors in the present day. Alferov's contribution included work on germanium diodes for use as a rectifier.

In the early 1960s, Alferov organized an effort at Ioffe Institute to develop semiconductor heterostructures. Semiconductor heterojunctions transistors enabled higher frequency use than their homojunction predecessors, and this capability plays a key role in modern mobile phone and satellite communications. Alferov and colleagues worked on GaAs and AlAs III-V heterojunctions. A particular focus was the use of heterojunctions to create semiconductor lasers capable of lasing at room temperature. In 1963, Alferov filed a patent application proposing double-heterostructure lasers; Herbert Kroemer independently filed a US patent several months later. In 1966, Alferov's lab created the first lasers based on heterostructures, although they did not lase continuously. Then in 1968, Alferov and coworkers produced the first continuous-wave semiconductor heterojunction laser operating at room temperature. This achievement came a month ahead of Izuo Hayashi and Morton Panish of Bell Labs also producing a continuous-wave room-temperature heterojunction laser.

It was for this work that Alferov received the 2000 Nobel Prize in Physics together with Herbert Kroemer, "for developing semiconductor heterostructures used in high-speed- and optoelectronics".

In the 1960s and 1970s Alferov continued his work on the physics and technology of semiconductor heterostructures in his lab at the Ioffe Institute. Alferov's investigations of injection properties of semiconductors and his contributions to the development of lasers, solar cells, LEDs, and epitaxy processes, led to the creation of modern heterojunction physics and electronics. The development of semiconductor heterojunctions revolutionized semiconductor design, and had a range of immediate commercial applications including LEDs, barcode readers and CDs. Hermann Grimmeiss of the Royal Swedish Academy of Sciences, which awards Nobel prizes, said: "Without Alferov, it would not be possible to transfer all the information from satellites down to the Earth or to have so many telephone lines between cities."

Alferov had an almost messianic conception of heterostructures, writing: "Many scientists have contributed to this remarkable progress, which not only determines in large measure the future prospects of solid state physics but in a certain sense affects the future of human society as well."

Scientific administration

In 1987, Alferov became the fifth director of the Ioffe Institute. In 1989, Alferov gained the administrative position of chairman of the Leningrad Scientific Center, now referred to as the St. Petersburg Scientific Center. In the Leningrad region, this scientific center is an overarching organization comprising 70 institutions, organizations, enterprises, and scientific societies. As a director and chairman, Alferov sought to ensure support for scientific research through a time of changing political and economic conditions.

Alferov worked to foster relationships between early educational institutions and scientific research institutions to train the next generation of scientists, citing Peter the Great's vision for the Russian Academy of Sciences to be organized with a scientific research core in close contact with a gymnasium (secondary school). In 1987, Alferov and colleagues at the Ioffe Institute established a secondary school in Saint Petersburg, the School of Physics and Technology, under the umbrella of the Ioffe charter. In 1997 Alferov founded the Research and Education Center at the Ioffe Institute and in 2002, this center officially became a new university, the Saint Petersburg Academic University, after gaining a charter to award masters and PhD degrees. In 2009, the Saint Petersburg Academic University was reorganized to officially combine the secondary school, School of Physics and Technology, within the organizational structure of the university, closely linking scientific education to research.

In the 2000s, through his role in academic administration and in parliament, Alferov advocated for and worked to advance Russia's nanotechnology sector. The primary research charter of the Saint Petersburg Academic University, which Alferov founded, was the development of nanotechnology. Alferov provided a consistent voice in parliament in favor of increased scientific funding. In 2006, Prime Minister Mikhail Fradkov announced the creation of a federal agency, Rosnanotekh to pursue nanotechnology applications.

Political activity

Alferov was elected to the Russian Parliament, the State Duma, in 1995 as a deputy for the political party Our Home – Russia, generally considered to be supportive of the policies of President Boris Yeltsin. In 1999 he was elected again, this time on the list of the Communist Party of the Russian Federation. He was re-elected in 2003 and again in 2007, when he was placed second on the party's federal electoral list behind Gennady Zyuganov and ahead of Nikolai Kharitonov, even though he was not a member of the party.

He was one of the signers of the Open letter to the President Vladimir V. Putin from the Members of the Russian Academy of Sciences against clericalisation of Russia. Alferov was an atheist and expressed objections to religious education.

Non-profit service
Alferov served on the advisory council of CRDF Global.

Illness and death
Since November 2018, Alferov suffered from hypertensive emergency. He died at the age of 88 on 1 March 2019. Alferov is survived by his wife, Tamara Darskaya and their two children, a daughter Olga and a son Ivan.

Awards

Russian and Soviet awards
Order "For Merit to the Fatherland":
1st class (14 March 2005) – for outstanding contribution to the development of national science and active participation in legislative activities;
 2nd class (2000);
3rd class (4 June 1999) – for outstanding contribution to the development of national science and training of highly qualified personnel in connection with the 275th anniversary of the Russian Academy of Sciences;
4th class (15 March 2010) – for services to the state contribution to the development of national science and many years of fruitful activity
Order of Lenin (1986)
Order of the October Revolution (1980)
Order of the Red Banner of Labour (1975)
Order of the Badge of Honour (1959)
State Prize of the Russian Federation (2001) in Science and Technology (5 August 2002) for his work, "Fundamental studies of the formation and properties of heterostructures with quantum dots and the creation of lasers based on them"
Lenin Prize (1972) – for basic research in semiconductors and heterojunction development of new devices based on them
USSR State Prize (1984) – for developing isoperiodic heterostructures based on quaternary solid solutions of A3B5 semiconductor compounds

Foreign awards
Order of Francysk Skaryna (Belarus, 17 May 2001) – for his great personal contribution to the development of physical science, the organization of the Belarusian-Russian scientific and technical cooperation, strengthening the friendship between the peoples of Belarus and Russia
Order of Prince Yaroslav the Wise, 5th class (Ukraine, 15 May 2003) – for personal contribution to the development of cooperation between Ukraine and the Russian Federation in the socio-economic and humanitarian spheres
Officer of the Legion of Honour (France)

Other awards
Nobel Prize in Physics (Sweden, 2000; with Herbert Kroemer and Jack Kilby) – for the development of semiconductor heterostructures for high-speed optoelectronics
Nick Holonyak Award (Optical Society of U.S., 2000)
EPS Europhysics Prize (European Physical Society, 1978) – for new works in the field of heterojunctions
AP Karpinsky Prize (Germany, 1989) – for his contributions to physics and technology of heterostructures
 AF Ioffe award (RAN, 1996) – for work, "Photoelectric converters of solar radiation on the basis of heterostructures"
Demidov Prize (Scientific Demidov Foundation, Russia, 1999)
Kyoto Prize (Inamori Foundation, Japan, 2001) – for success in creating semiconductor lasers operating in continuous mode at room temperature – a pioneer step in optoelectronics
Vernadsky Award (NAS, 2001)
"Russian National Olympus". The title "living legend" (Russia, 2001)
International "Global Energy Prize" (Russia, 2005)
H. Welker Gold Medal (1987) – for pioneering work on the theory and technology of devices based on III-V compounds of groups
Stuart Ballantine Medal (Franklin Institute, USA, 1971) – for the theoretical and experimental studies of double-heterostructure laser, which were created by laser light sources of small size, operating in continuous mode at room temperature
Popov Gold Medal (Academy of Sciences, 1999)
SPIE Gold Medal (2002)
Award Symposium on GaAs (1987) – for pioneering work in semiconductor heterostructures based on III-V compounds and group development of diode lasers and photodiodes
Golden Plate Award of the American Academy of Achievement (2002)
XLIX Mendeleev Reader – 19 February 1993
Honorary Doctorate from Tampere University of Technology (2007)
Honorary Professor of the medal and MIPT (2008)
Honorary Member of the Moscow Society of Naturalists (2009)
Honorary Doctor of the Russian-Armenian (Slavonic) University (State Educational Institution of the Russian-Armenian (Slavic) University, Armenia, 2011)

See also
List of Jewish Nobel laureates

References

External links

  Zhores Alferov website at the Communist Party of the Russian Federation
Biography, on the website of Ioffe Physico-Technical Institute
 including the Nobel Lecture 8 December 2000 Double Heterostructure Concept and its Applications in Physics, Electronics and Technology 
Open letter to the President of the Russian Federation Vladimir V. Putin

1930 births
2019 deaths
20th-century Russian politicians
21st-century Russian politicians
Nobel laureates in Physics
Belarusian Nobel laureates
Russian Nobel laureates
Deaths from hypertension
21st-century Belarusian Jews
Belarusian atheists
Communist Party of the Soviet Union members
Our Home – Russia politicians
Communist Party of the Russian Federation members
Members of the Congress of People's Deputies of the Soviet Union
Belarusian inventors
Belarusian physicists
Jewish atheists
Jewish Belarusian politicians
Jewish Russian physicists
Jewish socialists
Full Members of the USSR Academy of Sciences
Full Members of the Russian Academy of Sciences
Honorary Members of the Russian Academy of Education
Foreign associates of the National Academy of Sciences
Foreign members of the Chinese Academy of Sciences
Demidov Prize laureates
Lenin Prize winners
Full Cavaliers of the Order "For Merit to the Fatherland"
Recipients of the Order of Francysk Skaryna
Recipients of the Order of Lenin
Recipients of the Order of Prince Yaroslav the Wise, 5th class
Recipients of the Order of the Red Banner of Labour
Recipients of the USSR State Prize
State Prize of the Russian Federation laureates
Officiers of the Légion d'honneur
Russian atheists
Russian inventors
Russian physicists
Semiconductor physicists
Soviet physicists
Russian professors
Soviet professors
Members of the German Academy of Sciences at Berlin
Saint Petersburg Electrotechnical University alumni
Second convocation members of the State Duma (Russian Federation)
Third convocation members of the State Duma (Russian Federation)
Fourth convocation members of the State Duma (Russian Federation)
Fifth convocation members of the State Duma (Russian Federation)
Sixth convocation members of the State Duma (Russian Federation)
Seventh convocation members of the State Duma (Russian Federation)
Scientists from Vitebsk
Kyoto laureates in Advanced Technology